In hydropower, a surge chamber is a large pressurized underground chamber creating a free surface in the waterway to improve the dynamic abilities of the power plant waterways. It is generally used for long waterways when a surge shaft can not be created to fulfill the same purpose.

See also 
Surge tank

References

External links 
 Surge shaft at Invergarry Power Station

Hydropower